Julio Ricardo Cruz (born 10 October 1974) is an Argentine former footballer. He played for clubs in Argentina, the Netherlands and Italy before retiring in 2010. The longest spell of his career was spent with Internazionale, with whom he won four consecutive Serie A titles, among other honours. A large and physical player, who was known for his ability in the air, he usually played as a striker but he has even played as a winger, as an attacking midfielder, and as a centre-forward. In 2015, he opened his own charity foundation, the Julio Cruz Foundation.

Cruz earned 22 caps for the Argentina national team from his debut in 1997, scoring three goals. He represented Argentina at the 1997 Copa América and the 2006 FIFA World Cup.

Club career

Early career
In 1996, he moved to River Plate.

Feyenoord
In 1997, Cruz moved to Europe to join Dutch club Feyenoord. In the 1998–99 season, he helped them to the Eredivisie title, scoring fifteen goals. In 2000, he joined Bologna in Italy.

Bologna
Under the management of Francesco Guidolin at Bologna, Cruz was mainly used as a lone striker. While he was often derided by fans and the media alike for his lack of goalscoring proficiency, he did prove to be extremely apt at holding the ball up in order to bring the other attackers into the game. In 2001–02, he played an integral part in Bologna's seventh-placed finish in Serie A, and while he only netted ten goals in the league, he earned back the respect of his critics for his intelligent and passionate football.

Internazionale
In 2003, Cruz left Bologna to sign for Internazionale. He was allocated squad number 9 and made his Inter debut on 14 September 2003 in the 1–0 away win against Siena, playing the full 90 minutes. Three days later, he scored his first Inter goal in the 3–0 victory over Arsenal at Highbury Stadium on 17 September 2003 in the UEFA Champions League. He continued with his good form, notably scoring a crucial double against Juventus in a 3–1 away win.

With the Nerazzurri, Cruz rarely played regularly in the first team, finding some playing time usually just when the leading strikers were unavailable, and often being used as a substitute. Thus, he scored 12 league goals in his first two seasons with Inter. In a Champions League match against Porto on 1 November 2005, he scored twice in 30 minutes after being sent in to replace striker Adriano, turning a 0–1 into a 2–1 victory.

In the winter of 2005, Cruz was linked with rumours to Roma and other clubs because his contract was set to expire, however
in February 2006, he extended his contract to the summer of 2008. On 8 April 2006, Cruz received his first ever red card during the league match against Ascoli for dissent after sarcastically applauding referee Stefano Farina.

Cruz ended the season as Inter's top scorer with 21 goals, including 15 Serie A goals, and the second goal in the return match for the final of the 2006 Coppa Italia Final that Inter won 3–1 against Roma. He signed a new contract in September 2007.

Lazio

On 31 July 2009, Cruz left Inter and signed with Lazio on a two-year contract as free agent, but also paid €2.15 million sign-on fees to Van Dijk B.V.; Lazio was later fined by the FIGC due to third parties ownership and unlicensed agent Dennis Anthonius Johannes Maria Sickman.

Cruz made his Lazio debut on 8 August in the 2009 Supercoppa Italiana against Inter, appearing as a 72nd-minute substitute in an eventual 2–1 win at Beijing National Stadium, China, winning his first trophy in Lazio colours. He played his first match as a starter 12 days later, a match which brought his European debut with Lazio as well, playing the full 90 minutes in a 3–0 home win against IF Elfsborg for the first leg of play-off round of 2009–10 UEFA Europa League.

At the end of 2009–10 season, Cruz's contract with Lazio was mutually terminated, as he was suffering from injury. He announced his retirement from football on 7 September 2010, declining offers from Napoli and Grosseto.

International career
Cruz amassed 22 caps and 4 goals for Argentina. He participated in the 2006 FIFA World Cup, appearing as a late substitute in the matches against the Netherlands and Germany. He scored the opening penalty in the penalty shoot-outs against Germany, but Argentina lost 4–2 on penalties.

Nickname 
Cruz's nickname, "El Jardinero" (Spanish for "The Gardener"), was given to him at an early age as he was working as a groundskeeper for local team Banfield in 1993 when he was summoned by Oscar López to fill in for a missing player one day for a practice match. Upon noticing his talent, Banfield signed Cruz, and the nickname was born.

Cruz was also nicknamed "Poncharello" by Inter Channel commentator Roberto Scarpini due to his similar appearance with the character from the 1980s TV show CHiPs.

Career statistics

Club
Sources:

International
Appearances and goals by national team and year

International goals

Scores and results list Argentina's goal tally first.

Honours
River Plate
Argentine Primera: 1996, 1997

Feyenoord
Eredivisie: 1998–99
Johan Cruijff Shield: 1999

Internazionale
Serie A: 2005–06, 2006–07, 2007–08, 2008–09
Coppa Italia: 2004–05, 2005–06
Supercoppa Italiana: 2005, 2006, 2008

Lazio
Supercoppa Italiana: 2009
Individual
Coppa Italia Top-scorer: 2007–08

References

External links
 FootballDatabase provides Julio Cruz's profile and stats
 Statistics at Guardian Stats Centre
 

1974 births
Living people
Argentine footballers
Association football forwards
Club Atlético Banfield footballers
Club Atlético River Plate footballers
Feyenoord players
Bologna F.C. 1909 players
Inter Milan players
Eredivisie players
Serie A players
Argentina international footballers
1997 Copa América players
2006 FIFA World Cup players
Argentine expatriate footballers
Expatriate footballers in the Netherlands
Argentine expatriate sportspeople in the Netherlands
Expatriate footballers in Italy
Argentine expatriate sportspeople in Italy
People from Santiago del Estero
Argentine Primera División players
S.S. Lazio players
Sportspeople from Santiago del Estero Province